Mir Ali-Asghar Al-Mousavi (born 1954) is an Iranian diplomat and reformist politician.

2016 legislative election
After registration in 2016 legislative election from electoral district of Tabriz, Osku and Azarshahr by the Council for Coordinating the Reforms Front placed in Pervasive Coalition of Reformists East Azerbaijan Province. finally, with 102,255 votes was the fourth person and went the second round.

Views
He is one of the ambassadors and former director of the Foreign Ministry that was a supporter of Joint Comprehensive Plan of Action.

References

Iranian diplomats
People from Tabriz
1954 births
Living people
Iranian reformists
Shahid Beheshti University alumni
Al-Moussawi family